The Syracuse–Virginia lacrosse rivalry is an intercollegiate lacrosse rivalry between the Syracuse Orange and the Virginia Cavaliers. The teams first met in 1938 and have met 40 times. The all time series is tied 20–20, while Virginia leads 7–3 in NCAA Tournament play. This rivalry is considered especially fierce because of its extremely even-matched nature, and its historic tendency to occur in key NCAA Tournament matches. Its intensity has been further heightened in the 21st century due to Syracuse joining Virginia in the Atlantic Coast Conference in 2013, and is now considered one of the most monumental matchups in the sport year after year. Unique to this rivalry in the ACC is that it has its primary roots in lacrosse itself, and isn't a carryover from other sports.

These rivals have met in the Final Four or Championship Game of the NCAA Tournament on six occasions, with Virginia winning four. They decided the last NCAA Championship of the 1900s, with Virginia defeating Syracuse, 12–10, in 1999. In their Final Four matches, Virginia defeated Syracuse in 1986, in 1994, and in 2006; while Syracuse defeated Virginia in 1995 and in 2008.

This rivalry game has been an annual fixture of the regular season since 1995, nearly two decades before the teams played in the same conference. The exception was 2020 when the game was cancelled due to COVID-19. Their rivalry game then occurred twice in the 2021 regular season for the first time. Syracuse swept both regular season matchups in that year, including the most lopsided victory in the history of the rivalry. Ironically, it was Virginia that would then go on to win its seventh (and second consecutive) NCAA Championship in that year.

With 17 NCAA Championships between them, Syracuse and Virginia rank first and third all-time for NCAA titles in the sport.

Orange and blue
An odd facet to this rivalry is that the two schools share the exact same school colors: orange and blue. Virginia declared the orange-and-blue combination to be its unique colors—previously unused by any other university's sports teams— in 1888, some 79 years before Syracuse (having faced Virginia twice to that point in lacrosse but never in football or basketball) adopted the same combination in 1967. Between 1890 and 1966, Syracuse previously used orange as its sole school color, complemented only by white, an apparent reference to the Netherlands' House of Orange-Nassau which had originally colonized New York during the Dutch Republic. Virginia and Syracuse are the only Division I men's lacrosse programs to sport these colors; the founder of Auburn University's athletics programs, a Virginia graduate named George Petrie, adopted the orange-and-blue of his alma mater for that school as well, but Auburn only has a team that only competes in the Men's Collegiate Lacrosse Association. After Virginia (and Auburn, by extension) but before Syracuse, several other prominent college and professional (but non-lacrosse) teams began also using orange-and-blue as their team colors, including the Florida Gators (1906) and New York Knicks (1946).

History

Rival accomplishments

†Syracuse was forced to forfeit its 1990 NCAA Tournament record and Championship due to a rules violation, and these records do not reflect the forfeited games.

Game results

References

College lacrosse rivalries in the United States
Virginia Cavaliers men's lacrosse
Syracuse Orange men's lacrosse